Placek may be either a Polish language surname or a rendering of the Czech-language surname Plaček without diacritics.

Surnames Placek or Plaček (Czech feminine: Plačková) may refer to:

Abraham Plaček (1799–1884), Moravian rabbi
Adam Placek, founder and CEO of Polish company Oknoplast
Alan Placek,  American soccer player
Baruch Jakob Plaček (1834–1922), Moravian rabbi and writer
David Placek, founder of Lexicon Branding, American marketing firm
Jan Plaček ( 1894 –  1957), Czechoslovak footballer

, Czech comic actress and musician, member of Ivan Mládek's Banjo Band
Vladimír Plaček (1965-2018), Czech politician and physician
Wes Placek, founder of Artists Space Gallery, Melbourne, Australia

See also

Placek, a character from The Two Who Stole the Moon 
Placzek

Polish-language surnames
Czech-language surnames